Francisco Alex Souza da Silva or simply Francisco Alex   (born 23 December 1983 in Vitorino Freire, Maranhão), is a Brazilian footballer who played the 2016 season as an attacking midfielder for Oeste. He just signed in for São Caetano for the 2017 A2 Campeonato Paulista.

Honours
Rio Preto
Campeonato Paulista Série A2: 2004

São Paulo
Série A: 2007

External links

1983 births
Living people
Sportspeople from Maranhão
Brazilian footballers
Association football midfielders
Campeonato Brasileiro Série A players
Associação Atlética Internacional (Limeira) players
Grêmio Barueri Futebol players
Associação Ferroviária de Esportes players
São Paulo FC players
Sport Club do Recife players
Paulista Futebol Clube players
Esporte Clube São José players
Esporte Clube Juventude players
Botafogo Futebol Clube (SP) players
Marília Atlético Clube players